Adorf is a small town and municipality in the Vogtlandkreis to the south-west of the Free State of Saxony, Germany. Gettengrün, a village within the municipality, borders on the Czech Republic.

Etymology
The name Adorf can be analysed as "water-village", the "A" coming from old German word for water ("Ahha"), and "dorf" meaning a village.

History

Adorf was founded around 1200. In 1293 it gained the status of a "town". The town walls were commenced in 1477. Industries developed because of its favorable position and transport links: crafts, spinning, weaving, embroidery working with mother-of-pearl and musical instrument making. The  Johanniskirche was constructed in 1498. The town was destroyed by fire in 1768. The Freiberger Tor, the last remaining town gate in Vogtland, was rebuilt between 1768 and 1773 with a wooden framed upper storey. The current Rathaus was built in 1896- a period when many substantial houses were added to the streets round the market place.  It also housed a convalescent home for the poor of the city of Leipzig.

Geography

Adorf is located in the Elstergebirge, a low mountain range, part of the Erzgebirge. The lowest point in the Adorf district being in Rebersreuth (415 m) and the highest point being the "Hoher Stein" ("high stone") near Gettengrün (632.9 m). This "Hoher Stein" is not the same as the Czech Vysoký kámen 5 km to the east, whose name is also "Hoher Stein" in German.

The town of Adorf lies at the junction of the White Elster and Schwarzbach. These rivers are in deep "V" shaped heavily forested valleys. Many other brooks traverse Adorf: Tetterweinbach, Ameisenlohbach, Eisenbach and others. Alongside the Weise Elster runs the Bundesstrasse B92 and the Plauen–Cheb line, including Adorf (Vogtl) station, which is operated by Vogtlandbahn, that connects Plauen with Cheb (Eger) in the Czech Republic, and ultimately Pilsen Munich and Prague.

The Schwarzbach has its sources on the Vysoký kámen. Alongside it runs the Bundesstrasse B283 and a further railway line of the Vogtlandbahn, that link to Markneukirchen, Klingenthal and then Zwota and Zwickau.

The district includes the villages: Arnsgrün, Remtengrün, Hermsgrün, Rebersreuth, Leubetha, Freiberg, Jugelsburg and Sorge.

Adorf is bordered by Bad Elster, Eichigt, Markneukirchen Mühlental, and the Czech Republic.

Population

Places of interest

The "Freiberger Tor" is the only conserved town gate in the Vogtlandkreis, it houses a museum with the biggest exhibition of mother-of-pearl in Germany. Adorf has the longest marketplace in Vogtlandkreis - 231 metres. There is a war memorial for the soldiers who were killed during world war one and a memorial tablet for three citizens who were killed during the German-French war 1870/71. Johann Wolfgang von Goethe spent the night between 3–4 July 1795 at the old staging inn.

Near the town is "Miniaturschauanlage Klein-Vogtland", tourist attraction with models of 50 buildings in the Vogtlandkreis built to a scale of 1:25. Its botanical garden, the Botanischer Garten Adorf, contains over 11,000 plants from high mountains around the world.

Sons and daughters of the town

 Johann Caspar Kerll (1627-1693), organist, harpsichordist and composer
 Carl Gotthelf Todt (1803-1852), mayor from 1832 to 1849 
 Johann Adam Heckel (1812-1877), instrument maker
 E.o.plauen, (means: Erich Ohser from Plauen), Erich Ohser, (1903-1944), artist (Father and Son), born in Gettengrün

References
http://www.adorf-vogtland.de/stadt/fakten.htm

Vogtlandkreis